Oxypiloidea camerunensis is a species of praying mantis in the family Hymenopodidae. It is native to Cameroon in West Africa.

See also
List of mantis genera and species

References

Cam
Mantodea of Africa
Insects of Cameroon